Jason Taylor may refer to:

Jason deCaires Taylor (born 1974), British sculptor
Jason Taylor (American football) (born 1974), American football player
Jason Taylor (Australian rules footballer) (born 1968), Australian rules footballer
Jason Taylor (film producer), producer of 2067 (film)
Jason Taylor (English footballer) (born 1987), English footballer
Jason Taylor (rugby league) (born 1971), Australian rugby league footballer and coach
Jason Taylor (tennis) (born 1994), Australian tennis player
Jason Taylor (Fifty Shades), fictional character